FleetPro Passenger Ship Management was founded in 2012 as a merger of two existing passenger ship management companies and is based in Switzerland.  It combined International Shipping Partners (ISP), a passenger ship management services company headquartered in Miami, Florida, United States, and River Advice of Basel, Switzerland. The majority owners became a Netherlands-based private equity fund.  In January 2014 the two operations were renamed FleetPro Ocean and FleetPro River respectively.

Management and administrative services provided include deck and engine manning, maintenance, drydockings, inspections, conversions, upgradings and volume purchasing.

Former sea-going fleet
 Akademik Ioffe
 Akademik Sergey Vavilov
 Ambassador II
 Batanga Queen/Discovery Sun
 Beauport
 Caribbean Carrier (freight roro)
 Clipper Pearl/Clipper Pacific/Festival/Ocean Pearl
 Dolphin IV
 Enchanted Capri
 Europa Jet/Club Royale
 Island Breeze/The Big Red Boat III
 Island Sky
 Kapitan Khlebnikov
 Manistal/St Tropez
 Maya Express (freight roro)
 OceanBreeze
 Ola Esmeralda
 Palm Beach Princess
 MS Regal Empress
 Regal Voyager
 Rembrandt
 Royal Star
 Scandinavian Dawn/Discovery Dawn/Island Dawn
 Scandinavian Song/Santiago de Cuba/The Empress
 Scandinavian Star
 Seabreeze I, which sank in suspicious conditions in 2000.
 Seawind Crown
 Sonia
 Sun Fiesta
 The Big Red Boat II

Current sea-going fleet
FleetPro's fleet consists of mid- to small-size passenger vessels:

 Bahamas Celebration
 Clipper Odyssey/Silver Discoverer
 Freewinds
 Gemini
 Oasia
 Ocean Atlantic
 Ocean Diamond
 Ocean Endeavour
 Ocean Nova
 Ocean Pearl
 Perla (general cargo ship)
 Quest
 Scotia Prince/Prince
 Sea Adventurer
 Sea Discoverer
 Sea Explorer
 Sea Spirit
 Sea Voyager. ISP helped bring the vessel out of layup in 2010, to be used in providing accommodations for World Food Programme staff engaged in relief efforts in earthquake-stricken Haiti 
 Warrior Spirit

FleetPro also operate over forty inland waterways cruise vessels.

References

External links
 Fleet info (company site)

Shipping companies of Switzerland
Shipping companies of the United States
Companies based in Miami